Mainline Christian theology (including Roman Catholic, Eastern Orthodox, Oriental Orthodox, Church of the East, Anglican, Lutheran and most other Protestants) has traditionally held that only one baptism is valid to confer the benefits of this sacrament. Therefore, in cases where the validity of a baptism is in doubt, a conditional baptism may be performed. There exist other conditional sacraments.

The Council of Trent defined a dogma that it is forbidden to baptize a person who is already baptized, because the first baptism would make an indelible mark on the soul. Likewise, "Methodist theologians argued that since God never abrogated a covenant made and sealed with proper intentionality, rebaptism was never an option, unless the original baptism had been defective by not having been made in the name of the Trinity."

Description
Such uncertainty may result from questions about whether the Triune name of God was used by the person administering the baptism. In some cases, there are doubts about whether a church from which someone is converting baptizes in a valid manner. It is an issue where an infant is a foundling, and it is not known whether the child had been baptized before abandonment.  Another example of a case requiring conditional baptism is when an emergency baptism has been performed using impure water. Then, the validity of the baptism is in question. In that case, a conditional baptism is later performed by an ordinary minister of the sacrament with certainly valid matter.

In a typical baptism, the minister of the sacrament (in the Catholic Church usually a deacon or a priest, but sometimes, especially when the baptized is in imminent danger of death, a lay person) says "I baptize you in the name of the Father and of the Son and of the Holy Spirit" while pouring water upon the head of the one being baptized, or immersing him or her in water. In a conditional baptism, the minister of the sacrament says "If you are not yet baptized, I baptize you in the name of the Father and of the Son and of the Holy Spirit."

Other cases

Only the living can be recipients of Sacraments. Thus, if it is uncertain whether the baptizand is dead (i.e., their soul has parted from the body; this is the case for the first few hours or so after death in the modern sense), the formula is "If you are alive, I baptize [...]". In severe cases of birth anomaly, the (practically, always emergency) baptism formula is "If you are a human being, I baptize [...]".

Likewise, if an emergency baptism has been performed over a part of the body other than the head (practically: during birth), or on a pregnant woman's womb (for the unborn child), the child is to be conditionally rebaptized (with the usual "if you are not baptized") even though the emergency baptisms  be performed in this way if necessary.

See also

Emergency baptism
Rebaptism
Baptism of the dead
Sacramental character
Validity and liceity (Catholic Church)

References

Baptism
Christian terminology